The Samuel P. Taylor Service Station is a historic commercial building at 1123 West 3rd Street in Little Rock, Arkansas.  Built in 1938, it is an excellent example of a period automotive filling station with Art Deco styling.  It is a single-story L-shaped structure, with three service bays set at different angles, and an office in front.  A zigzag pattern of black tiles extends across the building's cornice, and black tile is used prominently around the main entrance and below the office windows.

The building was listed on the National Register of Historic Places in 2000.

See also
National Register of Historic Places listings in Little Rock, Arkansas

References

Gas stations on the National Register of Historic Places in Arkansas
Art Deco architecture in Arkansas
Commercial buildings completed in 1938
Buildings and structures in Little Rock, Arkansas
National Register of Historic Places in Little Rock, Arkansas